The 2026 Summer Youth Olympics, officially known as the IV Summer Youth Olympic Games and commonly known as Dakar 2026, will be the fourth edition of the Summer Youth Olympics, an international sports, education and cultural festival for teenagers, in a city designated by the International Olympic Committee (IOC). It was originally scheduled to be held in Dakar, Senegal for 18 days from 22 October to 9 November 2022, becoming the first IOC event to be held in Africa and the first in a Muslim-majority country. However, on 15 July 2020, the IOC and Senegalese government agreed to postpone the games to 2026 due to the operational and economical consequences of the postponement of the 2020 Summer Olympics to July 2021 due to the COVID-19 pandemic.

Originally scheduled to take place from 22 October to 9 November 2022, the event was postponed to 2026 as a result of the COVID-19 pandemic. On 9 December 2014 at the 127th IOC Session it was decided to move the organisation of the YOG to a non-Olympic year, starting with the 4th Summer Youth Olympic Games, to be postponed from 2022 to 2023. Subsequently, the IOC reverted to a 2022 date, and announced in February 2018 that they would be recommending that the event be held in Africa. The 132nd IOC Session confirmed the change of date back to 2022 on 7 February 2018. The host was announced at the 133rd IOC Session in Buenos Aires, Argentina during the 2018 edition. However, in July 2020, the postponement of what would have been the 2022 Summer Youth Olympics to 2026 was confirmed.

Bidding

The IOC voted to select the host city of the 2022 Summer Youth Olympics on 8 October 2018 at the 133rd IOC Session in Buenos Aires, Argentina.

Venues and infrastructure
Senegal proposes to organize the 2026 Summer Youth Olympics in three distinct areas, Dakar, Diamniadio and Saly.

Dakar
 Dakar Olympic Club – tennis, and other indoor sports existing
 Dakar Olympic Swimming Pool – diving, swimming, 3x3 basketball existing
 Iba Mar Diop Stadium – athletics, beach handball, football, rugby sevens existing
 Dakar National Wrestling Arena – wrestling, and other combat sports / 20,000 existing

Diamniadio
 New Main Stadium – TBA / 50,000 new
 Dakar Arena – indoor sports / 15,000 existing
 Dakar Expo Center (5 halls) – indoor sports new
 Mbow University – TBA new
 Mbow University Youth Olympic Village – Olympic Village, new

Saly
The city of Saly will host water sports, beach sports and golf.

The Games

Sports
The 2026 Summer Youth Olympics will feature 244 events in 35 sports. The International Olympic Committee approved the game programme. Breakdancing, skateboarding, climbing, surfing and karate will join the 28 core sports.There will be no mixed team events (NOCs) for the first time, 1 open event (Equestrian), 115 men's events, and 115 women's events. Baseball5 and wushu were subsequently added as optional sports.

Media coverage 
 – JTBC
 – JTBC
 – Plan B
 – Grupo Globo

See also 
 127th IOC Session
 133rd IOC Session

References

External links
Youth Olympic Games website

 
2026 in youth sport
2026 in Senegalese sport
Summer Youth Olympics 2026
Youth Olympic Games by year
International sports competitions hosted by Senegal